Hank Schyma, also known as Pecos Hank, is a musician, songwriter, filmmaker and professional storm chaser based in Houston, Texas. He has fronted the rock group Southern Backtones for over fifteen years. During the same period, he has directed, produced and starred in a full-length independent film, several music videos, and a catalogue of storm and nature documentation. He served as storm consultant on a major motion picture, and is credited with the discovery of a Transient Luminous Event called a Ghost.

Early life 
Hank Schyma was born and raised in Houston. Most of his growth and formative years were spent in the Pecos River Valley.

Schyma stated that he's hard-pressed to recall a specific reason why storm chasing held such an allure for him, though he admits an early fascination with the tornado scene from The Wizard of Oz.

Career 
He relocated briefly to Huntington Beach, California in the early 1990s, reportedly "to be a rock star, but ended up just surfing and delivering pizza." By 1994, he was already back in Texas, capturing severe weather footage on his own and beginning the music for what would later become Southern Backtones.'

In 1995 he joined KHOU-TV's news team working as a camera operator, which gave him the opportunity to work under their head meteorologist, Dr. Neil Frank.

Schyma is regarded to have gained professional storm chaser status in 2007 when he was appointed as KRIV's exclusive in-house storm chaser. He launched an ongoing project to photograph the complete body of snakes native to North America (though he feels it's moving a little slowly). Multiple music videos were produced during this period as well, including one which features a return to his home in the Pecos River Valley. 2011 saw the release of his first full-length independent feature film, Honky Tonk Blood. The soundtrack to the film was released separately, featuring a wealth of regional talent and long time collaborators, including Johnny Falstaff, Craig Kinsey, and Two Star Symphony.

El Reno Blues 
Hank eventually left the usual rock band format in favor of mostly acoustic performances, often as a duet with violinist Jo Bird of Two Star Symphony. The new format in turn informed his recording format, which led to a solo album with a new approach. El Reno Blues was released in 2015. It was met with much praise among aficionados of southwestern American culture.

Pecos Hank was present in El Reno, Oklahoma on May 31, 2013, to witness and capture the widest tornado ever recorded. He recounted witnessing an 18-wheeler grounded by the tornado on the outskirts of town, though he later found that its driver survived the ordeal in the truck cabin unharmed. The driver's brush with mortality and the location of the incident were later commemorated on the album.

Hank was present at Soso, Mississippi during the 2020 Easter tornado outbreak. He tracked both of the recorded EF4 tornadoes in the area. There were three deaths from the first tornado. In addition to tracking the tornadoes, Hank helped a family find a trapped man in the wreckage of a house.

Recent Work 
Pecos Hank continues to contribute lightning and storm coverage to a variety of national and international outlets. In 2014, he served as Storm Consultant for the film The Last Witch Hunter.

YouTube Work 
He also has a YouTube channel called "Pecos Hank" Where he documents his storm chasing around Tornado Alley. The channel as of June 23, 2022 has 1M subscribers and his most viewed video is "TOP 10 BEST TORNADOES" with 26 million views.

Arcade Fire Collaboration 
He recently collaborated with the Canadian indie rock band Arcade Fire on the music video for The Lightning I, II. He was included in the Special Thanks section.

Contributions to Science 

On May 25, 2019, Schyma is credited with the discovery of a new Transient Luminous Event called a ghost. They are faint, green glows that appear after red sprites. The name Ghost is an acronym for Green emissions from excited Oxygen in Sprite Tops. Schyma explains, the name ghost also maintains the theme of other transient luminous events such as sprites, trolls, elves and pixies.

Schyma has been working with University of Wisconsin atmospheric scientist Dr. Leigh Orf validating supercomputer simulations of destructive tornadoes.  “Schyma’s high-quality videos of supercells and tornadoes enable Orf to directly compare his models with what Schyma has experienced in real life, helping the research group demonstrate the validity of the model.” 

Schyma is also part of atmospheric scientist Dr. Anton Seimon's research team employing photogrammetry to estimate tornadic wind speeds and putting together a 3-D visual representation of a storm."

References

Musicians from Texas
American rock musicians
Storm chasers
Living people
1982 births